Anakkampoyil is a village located 13 km from Thiruvambady town in Kozhikode district of Kerala, India.

Location
It is located in the hill side valley of Vellarimala. Nearby attractions include Kadappanchal bridge and Arippara Waterfalls.

Transportation
The important upcoming developmental project in this area is the construction of the Calicut - Wayanad tunnel road through Anakkampoyil - Kalladi - Meppadi. By constructing this road the traffic congestion problem in Wayanad pass can be solved. An 8 km road will be constructed through the forest including two small bridges across Iruvanjippuzha and Kaniyad river. Currently, a road is available which passes through Anakkampoyil - Mutahappanpuzha - Marippuzha and from Meppadi to Thollayiram Estate. Once the road is constructed, transportation from Wayanad to southern districts of Kerala will be easier and about 30 km can be reduced. Currently, it is recommended to travel through the Marippuzha - Anakkampoyil - Thiruvambady - Mukkam - Kunnamangalam route.

Tourist Places
1. Vavul Mala

2. Olichuchattam Waterfalls

3. Arippara Water Falls

4. Vellarimala

References

Thamarassery area